Mireya González Álvarez (born 18 July 1991) is a Spanish handballer for SCM Râmnicu Vâlcea and the Spanish national team.

International honours   
EHF Champions League:
Winner: 2018
EHF Cup:
Winner: 2019
EHF Challenge Cup:
Winner: 2015
World Championship:
Runner-up: 2019

Notes

References

External links

Living people
1991 births
Spanish female handball players
Sportspeople from León, Spain
Expatriate handball players
Spanish expatriate sportspeople in France
Spanish expatriate sportspeople in Hungary 
Spanish expatriate sportspeople in Romania 
Győri Audi ETO KC players
Siófok KC players
SCM Râmnicu Vâlcea (handball) players
Competitors at the 2013 Mediterranean Games
Mediterranean Games competitors for Spain
Handball players at the 2020 Summer Olympics
21st-century Spanish women